This is a list of railway stations in the Dutch province Friesland:

Current stations 
 Akkrum railway station
 Buitenpost railway station
 Deinum railway station
 De Westereen railway station
 Dronryp railway station
 Feanwâlden railway station
 Franeker railway station
 Grou-Jirnsum railway station
 Harlingen railway station
 Harlingen Haven railway station
 Heerenveen railway station
 Heerenveen IJsstadion railway station
 Hindeloopen railway station
 Hurdegaryp railway station
 Koudum-Molkwerum railway station
 Leeuwarden railway station
 Leeuwarden Camminghaburen railway station
 Mantgum railway station
 Sneek railway station
 Sneek Noord railway station
 Stavoren railway station
 Wolvega railway station
 Workum railway station
 IJlst railway station

Closed stations 
 Anjum railway station
 Beers railway station
 Blija railway station
 Bozum railway station
 Dokkum-Aalsum railway station
 Dongjum railway station
 Ferwerd railway station
 Finkum railway station
 Franeker Halte railway station
 Hallum railway station
 Hantum railway station
 Hijum railway station
 Holwerd railway station
 Jelsum railway station
 Jorwerd railway station
 Leeuwarden Achter de Hoven railway station
 Leeuwarden Halte railway station
 Marrum-Westernijkerk railway station
 Metslawier railway station
 Midlum-Herbaijum railway station
 Minnertsga railway station
 Morra-Lioessens railway station
 Nijhuizum railway station
 Oosterbierum railway station
 Oudega railway station
 Peperga railway station
 Scharnegoutum railway station
 Sexbierum-Pietersbierum railway station
 Sint Annaparochie railway station
 Sint Jacobiparochie railway station
 Stiens railway station
 Ternaard railway station
 Tietjerk railway station
 Tzummarum railway station
 Vrouwbuurtstermolen railway station
 Vrouwenparochie railway station
 Warns railway station
 Wiewerd railway station
 Wijnaldum railway station

See also
 Railway stations in the Netherlands

 
Friesland